Javadabad may refer to:

Fars Province
Javadabad, Fars, a village in Kazerun County

Ilam Province
Javadabad, Ilam, a village in Darreh Shahr County

Kerman Province

Lorestan Province
Javadabad, Delfan, a village in Delfan County
Javadabad, Selseleh, a village in Selseleh County

Semnan Province

Sistan and Baluchestan Province
Javadabad, Sistan and Baluchestan, a village in Khash County

Tehran Province
Javadabad, Varamin, a city
Javadabad District, an administrative subdivision